Allan Thomas Hird Sr. (11 August 1918 – 16 May 2007) was an Australian rules football player, coach and executive in the Victorian Football League (now AFL).

VFL playing career
Recruited from Williamstown, Hird joined the Hawthorn Football Club where he made his debut in 1938. He played 14 games for the club before moving to Essendon in 1940. It was at the Bombers he enjoyed his greatest success, playing 102 games from 1940-45 as a pacy flanker, and being a part of the 1942 premiership team.

VFL coaching career
Hird later spent two years with the St Kilda Football Club as captain-coach, leaving at the end of 1947. After returning to Essendon, Hird was captain-coach of the Essendon Seconds (Reserves) team from 1948 to 1952 and non-playing coach from 1953 to 1954, before retiring from all forms of playing. In his seven years as captain-coach of the Seconds, the team won the premiership twice, in 1950 and 1952 (Hird's last match), and was runner-up three times.

All but one of the 20 players, Allan Taylor, in Hird's highly talented 1952 Essendon Seconds Premiership team that beat Collingwood Seconds 7.14 (56) to 4.5 (29) had either already played for the Essendon Firsts or would go on to do so in the future. Excluding the senior games that some, such as Hird, had already played (or would go on to play) with other VFL clubs, the members of the Essendon 1952 Seconds Premiership Team played an aggregate total of 1072 senior games for Essendon Firsts.

Post-playing career
Hird joined Essendon's club committee in 1955–1958 and became treasurer for the 1959 and 1960 seasons. He became vice-president in 1965, before holding the position as president of the club from 1969–1975.

The Allan T. Hird Stand was named in his honour at Windy Hill in Essendon, and he was an inaugural inductee into the club's Hall of Fame, given Legend status, in 1996.

Hird was the father of Allan Hird Jr., who also had a brief playing career with Essendon. His grandson is former Essendon captain and coach James Hird.

Footnotes

References

External links

St Kilda Football Club coaches
1918 births
2007 deaths
Essendon Football Club players
Essendon Football Club Premiership players
Hawthorn Football Club players
St Kilda Football Club players
Williamstown Football Club players
Essendon Football Club administrators
Australian rules footballers from Bendigo
One-time VFL/AFL Premiership players